John Godfrey Charters (25 October 1913 – 16 January 1995) was a New Zealand rower.

He won the bronze medal at the 1938 British Empire Games as part of the men's eight.

References

1913 births
1995 deaths
New Zealand male rowers
Rowers at the 1938 British Empire Games
Commonwealth Games bronze medallists for New Zealand
Commonwealth Games medallists in rowing
Medallists at the 1938 British Empire Games